Interstate 515 (I-515) is a  spur route of I-15 in the US state of Nevada that runs from the junction of I-11, I-215, and State Route 564 (SR 564) at the Spaghetti Bowl Interchange in Henderson to the junction of I-15, U.S. Route 93 (US 93), and US 95 at the Las Vegas Spaghetti Bowl Interchange in Downtown Las Vegas. The freeway connects traffic headed from Boulder City and Henderson to Downtown Las Vegas via a direct, high-speed route, and it runs concurrently with both US 93 and US 95 along its entire length.

The I-515 designation was first approved in 1976, but construction did not begin until 1982, and was constructed in stages until it reached its former terminus north of Railroad Pass in 1994, when signs of the designation finally were put up. I-515 was built to bypass Fremont Street and Boulder Highway, both of which were former alignments of US 93, US 95, and US 466, and provide a direct freeway connection with Henderson.

Route description

The southern terminus of I-515 is at an interchange with I-11, I-215, US 93, US 95, and SR 564 in Henderson, a suburb of Las Vegas. The freeway continues south as I-11 towards Boulder City and the Hoover Dam on the former alignment of I-515. The six-lane freeway travels northwest from the interchange and carries the concurrent designations of I-515, US 93, and US 95 through Henderson as it passes the Sunset Station casino and Galleria at Sunset shopping mall. I-515 then turns north and intersects Tropicana Avenue (SR 593), Flamingo Road (SR 592), and the Boulder Highway (SR 582) as it approaches Las Vegas. After entering the city of Las Vegas, the highway turns west and intersects Las Vegas Boulevard on the north side of Downtown Las Vegas. I-515 ends at the Spaghetti Bowl, an interchange with I-15, while the roadway continues west as Oran K. Gragson Freeway (carrying US 95).

History

Prior to the completion of the freeway, US 93 and US 95 originally followed Fremont Street/Boulder Highway from Downtown Las Vegas southeast through Henderson to Boulder City. Boulder Highway was signed as a business route of US 93/US 95 after the freeway was completed, but that designation has since been removed; it is now just SR 582.

The I-515 freeway, which began construction in 1982, is a continuation of the Oran K. Gragson Freeway (named for the former Las Vegas mayor who advocated for the construction of the then Las Vegas Expressway) which ran primarily along the former West Fremont Street alignment between Las Vegas Boulevard and Rainbow Boulevard. The spur was completed southeast to Charleston Boulevard (SR 159) in 1984, to Tropicana Avenue (SR 593) in 1986, to Russell Road in 1988, to Lake Mead Parkway (SR 564) (then known as Lake Mead Drive, SR 146 west and SR 147 east), in 1990, and finally to Railroad Pass just south of Boulder Highway in 1994 at an at-grade intersection with Paradise Hills Drive (which was eventually removed).

The I-515 designation was first approved by the American Association of State Highway and Transportation Officials (AASHTO) on July 12, 1976, from the I-15 interchange to the junction of US 93 and US 95 (at Boulder Highway, current exit 70). On December 7, 1984, AASHTO approved the southeasterly extension of the route to its former terminus near Boulder City. Even though the route number was approved prior to the highway's construction, I-515 was not consistently signed until after the freeway was completed down to its former southern terminus north of Railroad Pass in 1994.

With the pending construction of the Boulder City Bypass introducing the I-11 designation to Nevada, the Nevada Department of Transportation (NDOT) sought to connect the new route to other Interstate Highways. NDOT submitted an application to AASHTO at their spring 2014 meeting to request the designation of "Future Interstate 11", which included routing I-11 along existing I-515 between Railroad Pass and the I-215 Henderson Spaghetti Bowl interchange—AASHTO approved this request on May 29, 2014, with condition that it also be approved by the Federal Highway Administration. The Boulder City Bypass was completed in August 2018. NDOT began replacing I-515 signs along the southern stretch with I-11 signs on March 17, 2019. The signing continued through April 26, 2019.

Future
The designation of future I-11 is planned to connect the Phoenix, Arizona, and Las Vegas metropolitan areas, with potential for future expansion northwest of Las Vegas to Reno in the northwestern part of the state.

The current I-515 alignment, with a continuation northwest along US 95, is one of three corridors under consideration to carry the I-11 designation through the Las Vegas Valley. On July 27, 2022, it was announced that the Nevada Department of Transportation had chosen the central corridor, following the current path of I-515 and US 95, as the preferred alternative for the alignment of I-11 through Las Vegas.

Exit list
Exits on I-515 are numbered according to US 95 mileposts.

See also

References

External links

 Interstate Guide: Interstate 515
 Nevada Department of Transportation I-515 Corridor Study

15-5
515
15-5
Transportation in Clark County, Nevada
Transportation in the Las Vegas Valley